SoulPad is a mobile computing project developed by researchers at IBM. The project's aim is to provide a computer user with the ability to suspend their operating system and resume it on another computer using a USB data storage device. The SoulPad project is the subject of a paper entitled Reincarnating PCs with Portable SoulPads, which won Best Paper at the 2005 ACM/USENIX MobiSys conference. A  demo video of the technology in action was made available on IBM's website.

The researchers of the project have suggested that SoulPad could be used to boot one's operating environment from USB compatible storage devices such as cell phones and iPods (the latter being used in the video demo of the project).

The name SoulPad is derived from the project's aim to separate the underlying computer hardware (the "body" of the computer) from the user's operating environment (the "soul" of the computer). The "Pad" part is most likely a reference to IBM's former ThinkPad line of laptop computers.

Usage
To use SoulPad, the user first suspends the state of their operating environment to the USB storage device. The user then takes their USB storage device, connects it to another computer and boots from the device. The user's operating environment is then restored to its running state from when it was first suspended; all applications and services are resumed as if the operating environment had not ceased operation.

Implementation
The implementation of the technology is outlined in the SoulPad software stack, which is a model for the project's layers of abstraction. SoulPad utilizes the Live Linux distribution Knoppix as the "host" operating system; the computer system boots to Knoppix to recognize any devices the system has attached to it. The host then runs the VMware virtual machine, which resumes the user's last session in their operating system.

Issues
Issues addressed in the paper include the large amount of resources necessary to use SoulPad. In addition, the paper mentions the large amount of time it takes to resume from Soulpad (around two minutes), contrasted with the small amount of time it takes to suspend the operating environment. This is attributed to the need for Knoppix to recognize all the devices attached to the current machine. A solution suggested to correct this problem is to provide the user with a set of system profiles to choose from. Security concerns regarding access to the local disk on the temporary computer have also been raised.

References

External links

Input/output
Mobile software
IBM software